Polwhele is a surname. Notable people with the surname include:

John Polwhele Blatchley (1913–2008), London-born car designer known for his work with J Gurney Nutting and Rolls-Royce
Elizabeth Polwhele (1651–1691), playwright, one of the first women to write for the professional stage in London
Richard Polwhele (1760–1838), Cornish clergyman, poet and historian of Cornwall and Devon
Theophilus Polwhele (died 1689), English ejected minister

See also
Powel (disambiguation)
Powle